Geissorhiza ovata  is a species of flowering plant in the family Iridaceae. It is found growing on stone ridges and rock outcrops in Northern Cape, South Africa.

References

External links
 

ovata
Endemic flora of South Africa
Taxa named by Paul Friedrich August Ascherson
Taxa named by Paul Graebner
Taxa named by Nicolaas Laurens Burman